List of Southern Conference football standings may refer to:

 List of Southern Conference football standings (1921–1971)
 List of Southern Conference football standings (1972–present)